Kloek is a surname. Notable people with the surname include:

  (born 1952), Dutch historian
 Joost Kloek (born 1943), Dutch historian
  (born 1973), Belgian actress
 Teunis Kloek (born 1936), Dutch economist

See also
 , Belgian athlete